Small Korab is a peak of Mount Korab located both in Albania and North Macedonia. The height of Small Korab is 2,683m above sea level and is located along the main ridge of Mount Korab. The highest tall peak found close by to Small Korab is Mali i Gramës at 2,549m high.

References

Two-thousanders of North Macedonia
Two-thousanders of Albania
Geography of Dibër County